Wohnout is a Czech alternative rock band formed in Prague in 1988. The group comprises guitarists/vocalists Matěj Homola and Jan Homola, bassist Jiří Zeman and drummer Zdeněk Steiner. Wohnout is among the most popular bands in the Czech Republic and released nine studio albums since formation.

History
Wohnout was formed in Prague in 1988, one year prior to the Velvet Revolution. The lineup consisted of brothers Matěj Homola and Jan Homola, both on guitars and vocals, along with a bassist and a drummer. In 1990, however, Wohnout disbanded.

Brothers Homola reformed in 1995 with new bassist Jiří Zeman and a new drummer Zdeněk Steiner. Their first show was in 1996, and their debut album, Cundalla, was recorded in 1998 and released in 1999 by Sony Music/Bonton. Wohnout's popularity started to rise after the release of 2001's Zlý Noty Na Večeři. This album hinted their typical melodic rock style.

The next album Pedro Se Vrací was released in 2002 and Rande s Panem Bendou in 2004. Wohnout became one of the main rock bands in Czech Republic, and went on several tours Czech Republic and music festivals in Europe. They also recorded music videos. In 2006 Wohnout released Polib si Dědu (special guest for the song "Činely" was Finnish band Waltari) and in 2007 was Ahoj Dědo Tour. In March 2009, the band released a new album Karton Veverek.

Members
 Matěj Homola - lead & rhythm guitars, vocals
 Jan Homola - lead & rhythm guitars, vocals
 Jiří Zemánek - bass guitar
 Zdeněk Steiner - drums

Discography

Studio albums
 Cundalla (1999)
 Zlý noty na večeři (2001)
 Pedro se vrací (2002)
 Rande s panem Bendou (2004)
 Polib si Dědu (2006)
 Karton Veverek (2009)
 Našim klientům (2011)
 Laskonky a kremrole (2014)
 Miss maringotka (2018)
 HUH! (2021)
Compilations
 Nevydáno (2005) (rare and unreleased songs)

Official web page

External links 

Wohnout official website 

Musical groups established in 1988
Czech rock music groups
1988 establishments in Czechoslovakia